Quthbullapur Assembly constituency is a constituency of Telangana Legislative Assembly, India. It is one of 14 constituencies in Medchal–Malkajgiri district . It is part of Malkajgiri Lok Sabha constituency. It is also one of the 24 constituencies of GHMC.

KP Vivekananda of Telangana Rashtra Samithi is currently representing the constituency.

Overview
The Assembly Constituency presently comprises the following Mandals

Members of Legislative Assembly

Election results

Telangana Legislative Assembly election, 2018

2014

See also
 Quthbullapur
 List of constituencies of Telangana Legislative Assembly

References

Assembly constituencies of Telangana
Ranga Reddy district